Oenococcus is a genus of gram-positive bacteria, placed within the family Lactobacillaceae. The only species in the genus was Oenococcus oeni (which was known as Leuconostoc oeni until 1995). In 2006, the species Oenococcus kitaharae was identified. As its name implies, Oenococcus oeni holds major importance in the field of oenology, where it is the primary bacterium involved in completing malolactic fermentation.

References 

Lactobacillaceae
Bacteria genera